Ill Innocence is the second full album of the Japanese band Gallhammer. It was released in 2007, and helped secure the band's recognition within the extreme metal subculture.

Track listing
"At the Onset of the Age of Despair" (Vivian Slaughter) – 7:50
"Speed of Blood" (Vivian Slaughter) – 3:09
"Blind My Eyes" (Vivian Slaughter and Risa Reaper) – 3:23
"Delirium Daydream" (Vivian Slaughter) – 3:26
"Ripper in the Gloom" (Vivian Slaughter) – 4:31
"Killed by the Queen" (Vivian Slaughter) – 2:24
"Song of Fall" (Mika Penetrator) – 6:18
"World to be Ashes" (Vivian Slaughter) – 4:08
"SLOG" (Vivian Slaughter) – 8:35
"Long Scary Dream" (Vivian Slaughter) – 6:47

Personnel
Mika Penetrator - vocals, guitars
Vivian Slaughter - vocals, bass
Risa Reaper - drums, vocals
Makoto Fujishima - recording, mixing
Nocturno Culto - mastering
Trine Paulsen - design
Kim Sølve - design

External

References

2007 albums
Gallhammer albums
Peaceville Records albums